Harriet Tubman (18221913) was an American abolitionist and political activist. Tubman escaped slavery and rescued approximately 70 enslaved people, including members of her family and friends. Harriet Tubman's family includes her birth family; her two husbands, John Tubman and Nelson Davis; and her adopted daughter Gertie Davis.

Tubman's parents—Benjamin "Ben" Ross and Harriett “Rit" Greene Ross—were enslaved people who were owned by two different families. Their lives came together when Mary Pattison Brodess, Rit's owner, married Anthony Thompson. Ben Ross, owned by Thompson, met and married Rit Greene. They lived together until about 1823 or 1824, when Rit and their children went to the Brodess farm. Ben was a timber estimator and foreman and Rit was a domestic servant. After Ben was freed, he bought his wife's freedom. Ben was a conductor on the Underground Railroad and slaveholders were becoming suspicious of his role in escapes in the area. Tubman, having freed other family members, rescued her parents. After a short period in St. Catharines in Ontario, Canada, Tubman and her parents settled in the Auburn, New York area.

Tubman married a free man, John Tubman in 1844. In 1849, Tubman fled the area, believing that she was going to be sold. She returned to the area to bring John Tubman north with her, but he had already married another woman. Tubman operated a boarding house out of her home in Auburn and Nelson Davis boarded with her for three years before they were married in 1869. Davis fought during the American Civil War. They adopted a girl, Gertie, and operated several businesses out of their farm. They raised pigs and chickens, operated a farm, and sold eggs and  butter.

She made 13 trips to Maryland to bring back her brothers and parents, other family members, friends and others. She did not know of the whereabout of her sisters, except Rachel who was separated from her children and died before the family could be reunited.

Background
Family members of enslaved people were often spread out over a distance. Sometimes it was because they were sold to other slaveholders, in other cases because their enslaver had multiple properties that required slaves to be rotated across several residences. Sometimes, enslaved people were hired out for work. Children born to an enslaved woman were owned by the mother's slaveholder. In the case of Harriet Tubman's family members, their lives changed as needed to meet their slaveholder's needs. Their slaveholders were the white Brodess, Pattison, Stewart, and Thompson families of the Eastern Shore of Maryland.

Anthony Thompson married Mary Pattison Brodess, which brought together enslaved people from their families. Edward Brodess, son of Mary, became Thompson's stepson. Around the time of Tubman's birth, there was conflict in the family over a house in Bucktown that Anthony Thompson built for Edward when he reached the age of 21. Edward did not pay for the construction and Thompson sued him in 1823. Brodess counter-sued stating that he did not like the house. The case dragged on into 1827, mostly because Brodess did not appear in court. But Brodess ultimately won the case. In the meantime, in 1823 or 1824, Brodess declared ownership of Rit and her children and had them brought over to the Brodess farm, separating Ben from his family.

Ben and Rit Greene Ross
Born Araminta "Minty" Ross, her parents were Benjamin "Ben" and Harriet "Rit" Greene Ross. They were "respected as clever, honest, and religious people with a strong sense of family loyalty".

Ben

Around 1785 or 1787, Benjamin Ross was born in Dorchester County, Maryland, the property of wealthy landowner Anthony Thompson, who married Mary Pattison in 1803. She was the slaveholder of Rit Greene. Ben and Rit were married in 1808, through an informal marital ceremony, which was their only option to commit to one another.

Ben was a lumberman who supervised slaves who brought down poplar, oak, and cypress trees. He then transported them to Baltimore, where they were used to build ships. In the late 1830s and early 1840s, Ben and Tubman both worked on digging canals for Lewis and John T. Stewart, who were shipbuilders.

Anthony Thompson died in 1836. In the early 1840s, Ben was emancipated and received 10 acres of land following Anthony Thompson's death, as stipulated in his will. Thompson's son, Dr. Anthony C. Thompson, a "timber magnate" and a physician, inherited the estate. He also owned Poplar Neck, an area in southern Caroline County, where Thompson sent free laborers and enslaved people. Poplar Neck is approximately 35 miles from Peters Neck, where Tubman was born. Ben once said that Dr. Thompson was "a rough man towards his slaves, and declared, that he had not given him a dollar since the death of his father". He ultimately sold his 10 acres to Dr. Thompson.

He continued to work as a foreman and lumber estimator by hiring himself out within the Eastern Shore for $5 a day. He saved his earnings to buy his wife's freedom. 

He was a conductor on the Underground Railroad, which included hiding people on his property in Caroline County. The increase in successful escapes drew the attention of local law enforcement in 1857. He was seen as a "primary agitator", such as with the escape of the Dover Eight, which led to Ben and Rit's trip north to avoid retribution. They initially moved to St. Catharines, Ontario in Canada, but the climate was too cold for the 70-year-old couple and they then moved to Fleming outside of Auburn, New York.

Rit
Rit was born about 1785 or 1787 in Dorchester County, Maryland. Rit and her mother Modesty were owned by Atthow Pattison, and they lived on his 265-acre farm near Blackwater National Wildlife Refuge east of the convergence of the Blackwater and Little Blackwater Rivers. Tubman believed that Modesty had arrived in the colonies on a ship from Africa. Her grandmother may have come from the area now known as Ghana on West Africa's Gold Coast. People of that area are of the Ashanti ethnic group. In 1791, Modesty does not appear in Pattison's will.

In January 1797, Pattison died and left Rit to his granddaughter Mary Pattison, who was the wife of Joseph Brodess. There was a stipulation in Pattison's will that she and her children should be freed when they reached forty five years of age. In 1803, Mary Pattison Brodess married Anthony Thompson, who had an enslaved man named Benjamin Ross. She died in 1809 and her son Edward inherited her estate. 

Initially, her enslaved parents and siblings lived in Ben Ross's cabin on the Anthony Thompson farm at Peters Neck in Dorchester County, Maryland, in what is now the Blackwater National Wildlife Refuge. Around 1823 or early 1824, after the death of Mary Pattison Brodess Thompson, Edward had Rit and her five children moved ten miles away to the Brodess farm in Bucktown, where she worked as a domestic servant. Edward sold her daughter Linah. He attempted to sell her son Moses to a slave trader from Georgia, but Rit traded off hiding him in the woods and her cabin until the trader gave up and left.

Edward Brodess decided not to honor the stipulation in Pattison's will that would have freed Rit and her children at the age of 45. Edward died in 1849. Eliza Ann Brodess inherited her husband Edward's estate. Edward, and then his wife, Eliza Ann, hired Rit out and kept the money that Tubman earned. Gorney Pattison, great-grandson of Atthow, filed a lawsuit against Brodess for the monies that she earned, since she and her husband had not honored Atthow Pattison's wishes. Pattison lost the case.

Ben purchased his wife's freedom from Eliza Ann Brodess for $20 in 1854 or 1855, and the bill of sale was recorded on June 11, 1855, at the Dorchester County Court. Rit was not manumitted because a law of Maryland did not permit for enslaved people over age 45 to be set free. She then lived at Ben's cabin in Caroline County.

Nelson Davis

Tubman established herself in Auburn, New York on land that she bought from William H. Seward in early 1859 and the house was a haven for family and friends. In 1866, Tubman met Nelson Davis from Elizabeth City when he became a boarder at her house. He lived at her house for three years and they were married on March 18, 1869, at the Central Presbyterian Church. Davis was more than twenty years younger than Tubman. He was first known as Nelson Charles who had worked for a Charles family and probably escaped slavery by the Underground Railroad around 1861, perhaps on the Pasquotank River and the Great Dismal Swamp, which are both sites on the National Underground Railroad Network to Freedom. After he escaped, he changed his name to Nelson Davis, using the surname of his father, Milford Davis. He lived in Oneida County, New York by 1861. About 1863, he enlisted in the Union army and fought during the American Civil War. At the end of the war, he was discharged in Texas. In 1874, Tubman and Davis adopted a girl named Gertie.

Tubman and Davis operated a 7-acre farm and brick business in Auburn. They raised chickens and pigs and grew potatoes, vegetables and apples. Tubman sold butter and eggs. Tubman also continued to board people. Rit Ross lived at the house, as did four boarders. Between 1882 and 1884, their frame house was burned down, and a brick building was constructed. Around that time, Davis was very ill, requiring care, and he was unable to work. She also helped out family members in need, like her nephew John Henry Stewart's surviving wife Eliza and three children.

Davis died in 1888 of tuberculosis. Under the name Harriet Tubman Davis, she filed for pension benefits, which were provided for Civil War veteran's spouses.

Freedom in New York
Fearing that she was going to be sold away from Maryland, Tubman ran away in 1849. She followed the "north star" and was aided by white and black people to make her way north. Her parents were among the people that she brought north and out of slavery. They escaped with Tubman in 1857. 

Tubman arrived in Caroline County, Maryland with a horse and a makeshift wagon to pick up her parents, as well as the belongings they most treasured on their trip north. They traveled at night to a train that took them to Wilmington, Delaware, where they waited for Harriet at the home of Thomas Garrett. After a stop in Philadelphia to meet William Still, they headed north on a train to St. Catharines in Ontario, Canada, where Tubman had her headquarters and waited for fugitive slaves. 

Tubman made a meager income chopping and selling wood and working for farmers. Her parents spent a difficult winter, subject to illnesses from the cold. William H. Seward, the governor of New York, helped arrange for the purchase of land in Auburn, New York for Tubman and her parents. Her parents lived in Auburn the rest of their lives. When Tubman was away on Underground Railroad trips or during the American Civil War, friends looked after her parents. Ben died about 1871 in Auburn, New York. Rit died in October 1880, nearly 100 years of age.

Siblings and other family members
Ben and Rit had nine children together. Dorchester County records provide the names of Harriet's four sisters: Linah (b. 1808), Mariah Ritty (b. 1811), Soph (b. 1813), and Rachel—and four brothers: Robert (b. 1816), Ben (b. 1824), Henry, and Moses. Harriet also considered two of her nieces as sisters: Harriet and Kessiah Jolley.

Edward Brodess sold three of Tubman's sisters, whom she never saw again. A trader later wanted to buy her youngest brother, Moses, but Rit was able to resist being separated from her son.

A conductor on the Underground Railroad, Tubman made 13 return trips over 10 years to lead about 70 + people north, including her parents, siblings, and friends to freedom. Her first trip was in December 1850 when her niece Kessiah and her two children were to be sold. At the auction, Kessiah was sold to her husband John Bowley, a free black man. Before the children could be sold, the family left with Tubman for Philadelphia. Tubman led three of her brothers and other people away from Peters Neck on Christmas, 1854. Doing so, she took the risk of becoming enslaved again or lynched if she was caught, escaping slavery was particularly more risky after the passage of the Fugitive Slave Act of 1850. As a result, Tubman extended travel routes into Canada, where slavery was prohibited.

Three of Tubman's brothers worked at a plantation near a free black named Jacob Jackson. In 1854, Tubman had a letter sent to Jackson to coordinate the escape of the young men. She would look for them at her parents' home at Poplar Neck in Caroline County. The end of the letter states "tell my brothers to be always watching unto prayer and when the good ship of Zion comes along, to be ready to step on board." She was particularly concerned that her brothers would be sold to the Deep South.

For ten years, during multiple attempts, Tubman tried to rescue her sister Rachel, and her children, Angerine and Ben. During those attempts, Rachel had been separated from her children and she would not leave without them. In late 1860, Tubman found that Rachel had died and she was unable to rescue her niece and nephew.

Her brother John, his wife Millie, and their son Moses lived next to Tubman in Auburn. A number of nieces and nephews lived in Auburn, New York.

Marriages

John Tubman
She was married in 1844 to John Tubman, a free man. He was a neighbor of Ben Ross. Tubman had asked for permission to marry and live with John, which she received, but she was still to work for Broadess. She changed her given name about the same time, becoming Harriet Tubman. If they had any children, they would have been the property of the Brodess family. See Partus sequitur ventrem.

Realizing she was to be sold following her enslaver's death, Tubman escaped in 1849, when she was 27 years of age. She returned to lead her husband north with her, and she brought a new suit for him to wear on the trip north. However, he had married another woman who was free. He was killed in 1867 following a dispute with Robert Vincent, a white man, over ashes that Vincent wanted removed from a tenant's house. They fought in the morning and Vincent chased Tubman with an axe, but he was not able to catch him. Later in the day, he saw Tubman and shot him in the forehead. Vincent drove on without checking Tubman's condition. Tubman was killed instantly. Vincent was arrested on November 4, 1867. He was tried, and was found not guilty. He had claimed to the all-white jury that Tubman had come after him with a club.

Nelson Davis

Tubman established herself in Auburn, New York on land that she bought from William H. Seward in early 1859 and the house was a haven for family and friends.  In 1866, Tubman met Nelson Davis from Elizabeth City when he became a boarder at her house. He lived at her house for three years and they were married on March 18, 1869, at the Central Presbyterian Church. Davis was more than twenty years younger than Tubman. He was first known as Nelson Charles who had worked for a Charles family and probably escaped slavery by the Underground Railroad around 1861, perhaps on the Pasquotank River and the Great Dismal Swamp, which are both sites on the National Underground Railroad Network to Freedom. After he escaped, he changed his name to Nelson Davis, using the surname of his father, Milford Davis. He lived in Oneida County, New York by 1861. About 1863, he enlisted in the Union army and fought during the American Civil War. At the end of the war, he was discharged in Texas. In 1874, Tubman and Davis adopted a girl named Gertie.

Tubman and Davis operated a 7-acre farm and brick business in Auburn. They raised chickens and pigs and grew potatoes, vegetables and apples. Tubman sold butter and eggs. Tubman also continued to board people. Rit Ross lived at the house, as did four boarders. Between 1882 and 1884, their frame house was burned down, and a brick building was constructed. Around that time, Davis was very ill, requiring care, and he was unable to work. She also helped out family members in need, like her nephew John Henry Stewart's surviving wife Eliza and three children.

Davis died in 1888 of tuberculosis.  Under the name Harriet Tubman Davis, she filed for pension benefits, which were provided for Civil War veteran's spouses.

Notes

References

Source
 

Harriet Tubman
People from Dorchester County, Maryland